Frank Warren (born September 8, 1934) is a retired NASCAR Winston Cup Series driver who raced from 1963 to 1980. He is also a veteran.

Career
Warren had led 72 of the 88,863 laps finished in his career. Warren's total career earnings were $625,886 ($ when adjusted for inflation), while his average finish was 20th place in his entire career.

He was one of the last drivers to campaign a Dodge (Magnum) car in NASCAR up until the end of his days in top stock car circuit in 1980.  Lack of funds prevented him from rebuilding his Dodge for the 1981 season when the smaller (110" wheelbase) cars were mandated.  In the 1980s, he occasionally competed on the ARCA circuit, running a Chrysler LeBaron.  Native Tan was one of his consistent sponsors.

Flat tracks and short tracks were Frank Warren's strongest tracks; where finishes of 17th-place were considered to be routine. His weakest finishes came on road courses where he was expected to finish around 23rd place on average.

References

External links

1937 births
Living people
NASCAR drivers
Sportspeople from Augusta, Georgia
Racing drivers from Georgia (U.S. state)